Louise "Lou" Watts (born 4 June 1962) is a British musician, perhaps best known for her work as a member of anarcho-punk (and, later, folk) band Chumbawamba.

Born in Burnley, Watts was introduced to the band by friend and member Alice Nutter. She was a member of Chumbawamba from their formation in 1982 until their disbandment in 2012. She joined Boff Whalley, Danbert Nobacon and Midge and Tomi in 1982 to form the original line-up, and the band made their live debut in January of that year.

The band gained a reputation for their anarchist views, and they gained popularity for their opposition to homophobia and fascism and support of feminism and gay rights.

Watts provided lead vocals for the band's hit song "Tubthumping", which gained them international recognition, and topped charts in Australia, Canada, Ireland, Italy and New Zealand as well as "Tubthumping"'s follow-up song Amnesia, which reached number 10 on the UK Singles Chart. They were also nominated for a Brit Award for "Best British Single" at the 1998 Brit Awards, at which they also performed.

Along with Abbott, Whalley, Ferguson and Moody, Watts continued to work with the group and provide vocals, even after the majority of the original band members had departed and featured a shift in music style. She featured as a lead vocalist up until the band's last performances in 2012, becoming one of the band's longest serving members.

References

1962 births
Living people
20th-century English women singers
20th-century English singers
21st-century English women singers
21st-century English singers
Chumbawamba members
English anarchists
People from Burnley